TBS Universiteti RC is a Georgian semi-professional rugby club from Tbilisi, who plays in the Georgia Championship, the first division of Georgian rugby.

External links
TBS-Uni

Rugby union teams from Georgia (country)
Rugby clubs established in 1962
Sport in Tbilisi